The Fisheries Research and Training Institute is a research institution in Lahore, Pakistan. with work centring on inland fisheries and aquaculture in Pakistan. Its role is to promote fisheries and aquaculture in the country. The institute is divided in 7 sections: Aquaculture, Biology and Ecology, Nutrition, Pathology and Disease, Chemistry, Fisheries Management, and Training.

The institute is head by the Director Fisheries (R&T), Punjab Lahore and each section is headed by a Deputy Director Fisheries, each of whom is assisted by Assistant Director Fisheries.

Faculty

Research activities
The institute conducts multidisciplinary research and training activities, with the main objectives in related areas under:
 A. Merits of various aquaculture systems and methods to improve production of commercially important species
 a. Assessment of production potential with various levels of inputs in ponds.
 b. Formulation of low cost balanced feed.
 c. Breeding, selection and mass rearing.
 d. Diseases and their prevention.
 e. Pond engineering and water dynamics
 f. Fish production as a component of an integrated farming system.
 B. Biology and ecology of selected species of commercial importance
 a. Studies on food, feeding, reproduction, spawning, life cycles and behavior of selected species.
 b. Migration patterns of migrating species.
 C. Post-harvest technology for fish
 D. Management systems for lakes and reservoirs to improve fish production
 E. Control of pollution as affecting naturally occurring fish population
 F. Fisheries economics and marketing
 G. Studies of the socio-economic conditions of fishermen and fish farmers

Training
The institute organizes short and long term specialized training courses of a multidisciplinary nature covering the basic and applied aspects of Fisheries and Aquaculture for pre-service and in-service Fisheries personnel and private entrepreneurs. These courses include:
 Pre promotion course for Director Fisheries
 Pre promotion course for Deputy Director Fisheries
 Pre promotion course for Assistant Director Fisheries
 Pre promotion course for Fisheries Research Assistant

See also
 List of research institutes in Pakistan

References

Research institutes in Pakistan
Fish farming
Fishing in Pakistan
Fisheries and aquaculture research institutes